Off the Wall is an American children's game show produced by Vin Di Bona Productions that was shown on the Disney Channel from July 27, 1998, to 1999. It was hosted by Larry Zeno, and co-hosted by Kelli Kirkland.

Gameplay
Two teams of three children compete in a series of weird, outrageous and unusual events,; all played against nine pre-videotaped on-the-street contestants.

Rounds 1 and 2
In the first two rounds, one player from each team chose a video on-the-street player from the wall (hence the name of the show) to play against in a stunt. A brief videotaped interview, was then played, after which host Zeno explained the stunt. The stunt began with Zeno and the audience counting down (5... 4... 3... 2... 1... GO!), and the in-studio player's job was to beat the videotaped on-the-street player (sometimes within a time limit). If successful, the contestant earned points for the team, if unsuccessful, no points were awarded (ties always went to the on-the-street player).

One of the on-the-street players was dubbed the "Double Trouble" player, so-called because if the in-studio contestant wins the stunt, he/she earned double the points for the team.

Point values

Round 3 (Head-to-Head Challenge)
The final two players from both teams competed against each other and one last video player in this deciding round called "The Head-to-Head Challenge". To start, the video challenger's interview was played, then the challenge was explained and played. The first studio contestant to beat the video challenger earned 300 points, with an additional 250 points awarded for beating the studio opponent. (In the event of a tie between studio players, no points were awarded.)

The team with the most points won the game, and went on to play for a grand prize. The theoretical maximum score was 1,050 points (100 in round 1, 400 in round 2 [via "Double Trouble"], and 550 in round 3).

The Ultimate Showdown (Bonus Round)
In the bonus game, the winning team played one last game, this time against a member of the studio audience. After the game was explained, the round began. If any member of the winning team could beat the audience member, the team won a grand prize for each team member; if not, the winning team took home a consolation prize. Plus the audience member get a chance to come back to the show with two other teammates

External links
 Off the Wall Page at the Vin di Bona website

1998 American television series debuts
1999 American television series endings
1990s American children's game shows
Disney Channel original programming
English-language television shows
Television series about teenagers